Pine Ridge Secondary School is a public secondary school located in Pickering, Ontario operating within the Durham District School Board. It serves students in grades 9 through 12.

Location 
The school is situated outside a natural conservation area. It was built on September 8, 1992, and originally had 60 classrooms. In 2001, the school underwent major renovations to accommodate 20 additional classrooms.

Stabbing 
On January 17, 2018, a stabbing occurred at the school. A 16-year-old female student, a 17-year-old girl, and a 16-year-old male student (whose identities are protected by the Youth Criminal Justice Act) were arrested as a result of the stabbing.

Achievements

2000s 
In 2007, then-principal Sarah  McDonald was named one of Canada's Outstanding Principals by the Learning Partnership and the Canadian Association of Principals.

2010s 

In 2012, the province of Ontario awarded the school with its Premier's Safe School Award.

Notable alumni 
Perdita Felicien, champion hurdler
Shawn Mendes, singer-songwriter
Chris Van Vliet, Canadian television/radio personality

See also 
List of high schools in Ontario

References

External links 
Pine Ridge Secondary School
Durham District School Board
Ontario Ministry Of Education
The City of Pickering

High schools in the Regional Municipality of Durham
Pickering, Ontario
1992 establishments in Ontario
Educational institutions established in 1992